Upper Arlington (often  known by its initials U.A.) is a city in Franklin County, Ohio, United States, on the northwest side of the Columbus metropolitan area. As of the 2020 census, the population was 36,800. The Old Arlington neighborhood is listed on the National Register of Historic Places.

History

The land on which present-day Upper Arlington sits was first known to be inhabited by the Adena people, renowned for building conical mounds for burial sites. Centuries later the Wyandot lived there, eventually being expelled after the U.S. Government gave land grants to Revolutionary War soldiers in lieu of pay. Property originally bestowed in this area to Elijah Backus, Jonathan Dayton and Andrew Marker was sold as farm property to a number of different families in the 1800s.

Brothers and real estate developers King and Ben Thompson founded Upper Arlington. They purchased the original 840 acres of land, south of present-day Lane Avenue, from James T. Miller in 1913. It was directly adjacent to the Marble Cliff Quarry Co. They first referred to the area as the "Country Club District" modeled after the Country Club development in Kansas City, but by 1917 the community had become known as "Upper Arlington" in reference to its southern neighbor of Arlington (now known as Marble Cliff). The Upper Arlington Company was incorporated that year and by 1920 operated out of a field office built in Miller Park; that building also served as a streetcar shelter house and is presently the Miller Park branch of the Upper Arlington Library.

The development proceeded according to the Garden City–inspired plan by landscape architect William Pitkin, Jr., which called for following the contours of the land to form curving streets copiously lined with trees rather than a gridded street layout. This design style gave the oldest district in Upper Arlington (at its southernmost end) its distinctively pleasant, park-like feel, featuring numerous small green spaces.

In 1916, the development was interrupted when the National Guard used the area as a temporary training camp called Camp Willis after Ohio's governor at the time, Frank B. Willis. Thousands of servicemen were trained at Camp Willis and then dispatched against Pancho Villa on the Mexican border. The camp was dismantled by September 1916. Development resumed shortly afterwards, and on March 20, 1918, Upper Arlington incorporated as a village with a population of 200. James T. Miller, the original landowner, served as the first mayor. The Mallway business district, which was constructed in the 1920s, was the first commercial district in Upper Arlington.

Many restrictions existed as Upper Arlington developed. Some of these involved creating open, green spaces, maintenance of parks, generous setbacks ensuring large front and corner lawns, and carefully controlled development of separate areas for businesses and multi-family housing. From 1920 to 1945, the city enforced racially restrictive covenants in property deeds. In 1948, the Supreme Court ruled that racially restrictive covenants were unenforceable, and in 1968, they became illegal.

Upper Arlington became a city on February 8, 1941 and annexed surrounding land as its population grew. Most annexation occurred in the late 1940s through 1960. The two largest annexations occurred in 1954 and 1955, by which the city nearly doubled its surface area. Henderson Road has been Upper Arlington's northern border since 1969.

The annexed property was part of Perry Township, which had been home to numerous farm residents and their families in the 1800s. One such resident was Pleasant Litchford, a former slave who migrated north after buying his freedom, and who became a notable citizen in the African-American community. The current high school sits on property owned by Pleasant Litchford until his death in 1879. The property was annexed into Upper Arlington in the 1950s.

Other Perry Township farming family names from the 1800s include Kennedy, Kenny, Legg, and Trapp. The McCoy, Richards, Lakin, Matthews, Delashmutt, Phenegar, Slyh, Zollinger, Bickett, Wills and Walcutt families were connected in some way by marriage and have descendants living in Upper Arlington. Richards and McCoy family reunions were held for decades; their first was in 1895, with 109 in attendance.

The post–World War II housing boom led to the development of many new housing tracts north of Lane Avenue. The newer developments took on a much different character from the older core of the city, being mostly organized along normal street grids and with classic ranch-style houses like those found in the area called River Ridge. By the 1960s, as the city grew north, the houses were larger and the neighborhoods more consistent with the intent, if not style, of the original section south of Lane Avenue. The southern half of the city, designated as the "Upper Arlington Historic District" (or colloquially "Old Arlington" or "South of Lane"), was listed on the National Register of Historic Places in 1985.

Geography
Upper Arlington is bordered on the west by the Scioto River, on the north and east by Columbus, and on the south by Marble Cliff and Grandview Heights. The Olentangy River and the main campus of the Ohio State University are a short distance to the east of Upper Arlington. Downtown Columbus lies to the southeast, its skyline visible across the OSU farmland research facilities extending along Upper Arlington's eastern border.

The city is around 800 ft elevation located between the Olentangy and Scioto rivers. Two ravines cut through the city. The Slate Run in the northwest corner flows into the Scioto River. However, the Turkey Run is longer. It originates in the north then runs southwards until it makes an eastward bend around Reed Rd. Then, it flows eastwards through the OSU Golf Course. The run is used as a storm drain at points, has been dammed in the Ohio State course and runs through concrete pipes at two points. The soil is glacial till and is suitable for agriculture, supporting a research farm operated by Ohio State University.

Demographics

2010 census
As of the 2010 census, the population was 33,771 persons, 16,157 male (47.84%) and 17,614 female (52.16%). The following table summarizes census findings for age with the median being 42.8 years.

2000 census
As of the census of 2000, there were 33,686 people, 13,985 households, and 9,509 families households in the city. The population density was 3,450.2 people per square mile (1,332.6/km). There were 14,432 housing units at an average density of 1,478.2 per square mile (570.9/km). The racial makeup of the city was 94.7% White, 3.5% Asian, 1% Hispanic or Latino, 0.6% African American, 0.10% Native American, 0.0% Pacific Islander, 0.3% from other races, and 0.8% from two or more races.

There were 13,985 households, out of which 31.9% had children under the age of 18 living with them, 59.1% were married couples living together, 6.9% had a female householder with no husband present, and 32.0% were non-families. 28.2% of householders were living alone, 12.9% had someone living alone who was 65 years of age or older. The average household size was 2.39 and the average family size was 2.95.

In the city the population was spread out, with 75% over the age of 18 years, 2.6% 20 to 24 years, 15.5% 25–44 years, 16.9% were 45–54 years, and 21.1% were 62 years and older. The median age was 43 years.

Arts and culture

Upper Arlington promotes a diverse, lively accessible arts environment which includes a public gallery at the Municipal Services Center, temporary and permanent public art projects, educational programming in the schools, summer outdoor concerts, and the Labor Day Arts Festival. Established in 1966, the Arts Festival – the City of Upper Arlington's signature event – attracts more than 25,000 visitors to Northam Park to explore and purchase fine arts and crafts from approximately 200 artist vendors, enjoy art activities, interactive performances, live music and more.

The Parks & Recreation Department—in consultation with the Cultural Arts Commission—hosts numerous family oriented community events throughout the year, including Winter Fest and the annual holiday tree lighting, Fall Fest, Spring Fling and Summer Celebration. The city hosts a free, outdoor summer concert series in June and July, bringing a mix of local and regional musicians to the outdoor stage of the Amelita Mirolo Barn in Sunny 95 Park. In addition, a free outdoor summer movie series.

The Upper Arlington Civic Association (UACA) is responsible for a wealth of popular community events each year. Most notable, with assistance from the city, UACA hosts the community's annual Fourth of July celebrations, which include a large parade along Northwest Boulevard in the morning, and an evening festival – Party in the Park – which features live music and ends with a spectacular fireworks display. UACA also hosts an annual Easter Candy Hunt at Thompson Park, the Halloween event “Golden Bear Scare” at Smith Nature Park, visits with Santa at Christmas in the Park, a holiday home decorating contest and more.

Upper Arlington Public Library 
The Upper Arlington Public Library (UAPL) system comprises the Main Library, a 60,000 square foot facility located on Tremont Road near the geographic center of the city, the 10,000 square foot Lane Road Branch, approximately three miles to the north, and the 4,400 square foot Miller Park Branch, one and one half miles south near the center of Old Arlington. Prior to 1967, the libraries in Upper Arlington were branches of the Grandview Heights Public Library. After circulation at the Upper Arlington branches surpassed their parent library, Mayor John Dunkel spearheaded an effort to challenge a law prohibiting new library systems in Ohio. Thanks to his perseverance, the Ohio General Assembly passed Ohio House Bill No. 494 in 1967, allowing Upper Arlington to independently establish and govern its own library system. Celebrating its 50th anniversary in 2017, the Upper Arlington Library System is considered a community jewel, providing opportunities for lifelong learning and fellowship.

Government 
The City of Upper Arlington operates under the Council/Manager form of government—a system of representative democracy that combines the policy-setting leadership of elected officials with the strong managerial experience of an appointed manager. The City Council is elected by citizens and then hires a professional City Manager to run day-to-day operations and implement policy passed by Council.

Upper Arlington's Community Development Department coordinates the many aspects involved in the city's growth, development and preservation Building, Planning and Property Maintenance divisions. An Economic Development Division provides a range of services to help businesses, and amenities available to residents and strengthening the tax base. The Engineering Division manages the city's public infrastructure—such as roads, waterlines, sanitary and storm sewer systems, and public right-of-way. The Public Works Division focuses on minor road repairs, street cleaning, snow removal and leaf collection.

Upper Arlington's Fire Division also staffs all medic trucks with at least two paramedics and all fire apparatus with at least one paramedic at all times. The Police Division provides 24-hour service.

The Parks & Recreation Department maintains the city's parks, street trees and other public spaces. They offer programs and activities for youth, adult and senior adults varying from cultural arts, aquatics and tennis, culinary and crafts.

Upper Arlington oversees and maintains 21 parks covering approximately 186 acres. Park facilities include playgrounds, sports fields, shelters and picnic areas, walking paths, fitness trails and wooded areas. In addition, the City owns and operates three outdoor community swimming pools – Tremont Pool, Devon Pool, and the Reed Road Water Park – which are open Memorial Day weekend through Labor Day weekend.

Education

The Upper Arlington City School District serves the entire municipality. As of 2000, the Upper Arlington Board of Education was the city's largest employer. The district provides an early education school, five elementary schools, two middle schools, and a high school. Burbank Early Education School serves students before the elementary level and was created during a period when the population demanded fewer elementary buildings. The district offers an optional informal/progressive style of education through Wickliffe Progressive Elementary and Barrington Elementary, the latter of which also provides a contemporary program . Other elementary schools include Greensview, Tremont and Windermere.

Hastings Middle School was built in the 1960s and serves the northern area of the district. Jones Middle School is located in the former high school building that was also the site of the Willis National Guard Camp and serves the southern portion. Upper Arlington High School serves students from the entire district and boasts membership in the International Baccalaureate program. The Upper Arlington High School had recently in the year of 2021 just got remodeled to a three story school. The Upper Arlington High School mascot is the Golden Bear, which became the nickname of professional golfer Jack Nicklaus, an alumnus of the school.

Also in the city are a private K-12 school, The Wellington School and two Catholic grade schools—St. Agatha and St. Andrew. Both St. Agatha and St. Andrew offer K-8 programs and preschool childcare centers.

Notable people 
John W. Bricker, U.S. Senator and the 54th Governor of Ohio
Jake Borelli, actor
Cordelia E Cook, first woman to receive both the Bronze Star Medal and the Purple Heart
John Cooper, football player and coach for the Ohio State University from 1988 to 2000
Beverly D'Angelo, actress and singer
Nick Foligno, ice hockey player, team captain for the Columbus Blue Jackets
Simon Fraser, college and professional football player
Woody Hayes, head football coach of the Ohio State Buckeyes
Arthur G. James, surgeon who specialized in treating cancer patients, namesake of the Arthur G. James Cancer Hospital
Abigail Johnston, USA Olympic silver-medalist synchronized diver
Jack Nicklaus, professional golfer
William O’Neill, 59th Governor of Ohio
James A. Rhodes, U.S. state governor, served four, four-year terms in office
Randy Skinner, Broadway Director and Choreographer
George Smoot, Nobel Prize winning astrophysicist, cosmologist
Chris Spielman, professional football player, television sports commentator for ESPN and ABC Sports
Steve Stivers, U.S. House Representative for Ohio's 15th congressional district
 Melinda Lou "Wendy" Thomas, businesswoman and namesake for Wendy's
Rex Dave Thomas, businessman and founder of Wendy's
Jim Tressel, head football coach of the Ohio State Buckeyes, President of Youngstown State University

Sister city
The city has one sister city relationship:
 St. Andrews, Scotland, United Kingdom

References

External links

City website
Upper Arlington History
UA Archives - History of Upper Arlington

 
Cities in Ohio
Cities in Franklin County, Ohio
Populated places established in 1917
1917 establishments in Ohio